Antonio Franco may refer to:

 Antonio Franco (blessed) (1585–1626), Roman Catholic Italian priest and prelate
 Antonio Franco (footballer, 1911–1996), Spanish football midfielder and manager
 Antonio Franco (diplomat) (born 1937), Vatican diplomat
 António de Sousa Franco (1942–2004), Portuguese economist and politician
 Antonio Franco (journalist) (1947–2021), Spanish journalist
 Antonio Franco (footballer, born 1991), Paraguayan football goalkeeper